New College Boat Club (NCBC) is the rowing club for members of New College, Oxford. The club's existence can be dated to 1840 when it first raced on The Isis in Oxford. 

The club shares a boathouse on The Isis (part of the Thames) with Balliol College Boat Club, as well as using boat racks at Godstow for the Men's and Women's first boats.

History

The first record of a New College eight is in 1840, with another appearance in 1852. Only from 1868 did the college start to fully represent itself on the river. In these early years New achieved 'Head of the River' in the Eights in 1887, 1896-1899, 1901, 1903-04 (inclusive). In Torpids the club was 'Head of the River' in 1882, 1896, 1900-04.

The 1912 Stockholm Olympics

The New College Boat Club represented Great Britain at the 1912 Summer Olympics in Stockholm and won the Silver medal in the men's eight.

The two British crews were the favourites for gold so started at opposite ends of the draw. They both worked up through the competition to make the final. The course in Stockholm was not straight, and one of the two lanes was clearly favoured, the other requiring the cox to steer around a protruding boathouse and then back under a bridge.

Before the final, the two British captains met to toss for lanes. New College won the toss and following gentlemanly tradition offered the choice of lanes to their opponents, who would - in a gentlemanly fashion - refuse this offer. However the Leander/Magdalen College captain accepted this offer and chose the better lane. Leander went on to win the gold medal, leaving New College with the silver.

King Gustav V of Sweden was so disheartened by this display of ungentlemanly conduct that, as a consolation, he presented his colours to New College. Ever since then, New College have raced in purple and gold, the colours of the royal house of Sweden. A further tradition has been the adoption of the toast: 'God Damn Bloody Magdalen!', the supposed words of the New College stroke Robert Bourne as they crossed the line. The abbreviation GDBM has been used commonly ever since, and is still on bottom of the NCBC letterhead.

Henley Royal Regatta
The club has won four events at Henley Royal Regatta in its history.

Recent form

Christ Church Regatta
In 2019, the Men's Gold Boat won the Christ Church Indoor Regatta, beating Christ Church in the final in their own boathouse.

In 2021, the Women's Purple Boat won the Christ Church Regatta, competing against all the novice boats from other colleges.

Eights
In 2012, the Men's 1st VIII started 14th (1st Div 2) and finished 17th, the 2nd VIII started 30th (5th Div 3) and finished 31st. The Women's 1st VIII started 12th and finished 15th, the 2nd VIII started 57th (6th Div 4) and finished 51st.

Blues
A number of members of New College have gone on to row for the University.

References

External links

New College Boat Club Website
Oxford Bumps Charts

Rowing clubs of the University of Oxford
Boat Club
Sports clubs established in 1840
1840 establishments in England
Rowing clubs in Oxfordshire
Rowing clubs of the River Thames